The Queen Emma Bridge is a pontoon bridge across St. Anna Bay in Curaçao. It connects the Punda and Otrobanda quarters of the capital city, Willemstad. It was named after Emma of Waldeck and Pyrmont, who was queen consort of the Netherlands during its construction. The bridge is hinged and opens regularly to enable the passage of oceangoing vessels. On the opposite end from the hinge is a small shelter where an operator controls two diesel engines turning propellers. The propellers are mounted perpendicular to the length of the bridge and allow it to swing parallel to the shore. The process only takes a few minutes to complete.

The bridge was built in 1888 and was completely renovated in 1939, 1961, 1983-1986, and 2005-2006. The lighting arches were installed in 1955, to celebrate the royal visit of Queen Juliana and Prince Bernhard.

Originally a toll bridge from 1901-1934, individuals without shoes were permitted to cross the bridge without paying the toll. When the bridge swings open, two ferries spring into action to bring pedestrians across the water. The ferries are also free of charge. Motorized traffic ceased in 1974.  Locally, the bridge is known as "Swinging Old Lady" as it will swing to the Otrabanda side of Willemstad.

Gallery

References

External links

 

Former toll bridges
Pontoon bridges
Bridges completed in 1888
Buildings and structures in Willemstad